Archangel from the Winter's End Chronicles is an ongoing, action-adventure steampunk web series. The series began in 2013 and is still running through the present. The story takes place in a dark, steampunk world of 1893 London, where a masked vigilante leads an underground resistance in an ongoing fight against a tyrannical regime, which has their sights set on world domination.

Episode I - Ascension 

Episode I is a back story. It began life as an advertising effort to promote a line of steampunk clothes and accessories from a company called Museum Replicas Limited. However, writer/director David Di Pietro felt that it would be more exciting to develop a "world" in which these pieces existed.  This first episode, entitled Ascension tells the brief background of Brenden Winter and how he faked his own death, in order to save the ones he loves from becoming involved in his fight for freedom.

The production was shot in HD in Conyers, GA for a few thousand dollars. A second episode was planned, with a larger budget.

See also 
 Conyers, Georgia (filming location as of 2013)

References

External links 
 Official Website
 Official Facebook Page

American science fiction web series
Steampunk web series
2013 web series debuts